Heiner Ruland (6 April 1934 – 25 March 2017) was a German composer and music therapist.

Life 
Born in Aachen, Ruland studied chemistry after a humanistic secondary school education, then school music with harpsichord as main subject with Fritz Neumeyer in Freiburg im Breisgau. From 1963–1974, he worked as a music teacher at the Waldorf School Benefeld, Lüneburg Heath.

Based on Kathleen Schlesinger's research and Rudolf Steiner's suggestions, intensive musical-anthroposophical research work developed alongside teaching, as laid down in Ein Weg zur Erweiterung des Tonerlebens : musikalische Tonkunde am Monochord In the course of this musical-humanistic research, an extensive teaching and lecturing activity began. His work as a composer in an expanded tonal system became increasingly important. From 1976 to 2001, he continued to work full-time in the practice of Music therapy at the Öschelbronn Clinic, a hospital for internal diseases.

Ruland died in Hamborn at the age of 82.

Work

Vocal music

Sologesang 
 Lieder, Duette, Terzette
 Liederzyklen auf Gedichte von Hölderlin, Morgenstern, Heimlander, Goethe, Droste-Hülshoff

Choir 
 Die Tageszeiten
 Steffen-Chöre
 Der Seelenkalender
 Novalis-Chöre
 Prolog des Johannes
 Sophokles-Chöre

Cantatas 
 Advent-Kantate
 Die sieben Worte des Gekreuzigten
 Die sieben Erscheinungen des Auferstandenen
 Himmelfahrts-Kantate "Denn die Erde ist sein"
 Michaeli-Kantate
 Die Kristallkugel (Brüder Grimm)

Choir and Orchestra 
 Grenzen der Menschheit (Goethe)
 Der Tanz (Schiller)

Singspiel 
 Die Insel

Chamber music 
 Variationen über ein Thema von A. von Webern
 Das Viergetier für Bratsche solo
 Streichquartett
 Streichseptett
 Die Nacht der Künste für Flöte und Vierteltoncembalo

Clavichord, Clavicantal, Harpsichord, Organ 
 3 Sontinen
 Studie über die 8 Schlesinger'schen Töne
 Suite der Elemente für Cembalo
 Die Wochentage
 Der Öschelbronner Orgelkalender (12 Umspiele und Reihen)

References

External links 
 

German composers
Music therapists
1934 births
2017 deaths
People from Aachen